James Mitchum (born May 8, 1941) is an American actor.

Mitchum was born in Los Angeles, California, the elder son of actor Robert Mitchum (whom he closely resembles) and his wife, Dorothy Spence. His brother is actor Christopher Mitchum, and he is the uncle of actor Bentley Mitchum. His only child was born during his marriage to actress Wende Wagner (1941-1997).

Film career
James Mitchum had his first role, which was small and unbilled, at the age of eight in the Western Colorado Territory (1949) with Joel McCrea, Virginia Mayo, and Dorothy Malone. His credited debut was in Thunder Road (1958), in which he played his father's much younger brother, a role written for Elvis Presley, who was eager to do it until his manager demanded too much money. This film became a drive-in cult favorite, revived in the 1970s and ’80s. Curiously, he was again credited as being "introduced" in the Have Gun Will Travel flashback episode "Genesis" (season 6, episode 1, 1962).

He has appeared in more than 30 films including The Beat Generation in 1959; The Victors in 1963; as a surfer named Eskimo in Ride the Wild Surf in 1964; In Harm's Way (1965) with John Wayne, Kirk Douglas, and Henry Fonda. 

In 1965 Mitchum had the lead in a Spaghetti Western Grand Canyon Massacre, the following year was Ambush Bay (1966) with Hugh O'Brien and Mickey Rooney, in which he received third billing of three names above the title. He played the villain in The Invincible Six (1970), then appeared in Two-Lane Blacktop (1971); and The Last Movie (1971).

In 1975, he returned to lead roles when he starred in the movie Moonrunners, where he played the character Grady Hagg in the influence for the television series The Dukes of Hazzard. He was also in Zebra Force and Trackdown co-starring Karen Lamm and Erik Estrada in 1976; The Ransom (a k a Assault on Paradise) (1977); Blackout (1978); Monstroid (1980);  (1982); Code Name Zebra (1987); Hollywood Cop (1987); Jake Spanner, Private Eye (1989); and Fatal Mission (1990).

References

External links

American male film actors
1941 births
Living people
Male actors from Los Angeles
Mitchum family